Legislative elections were held in France on 26 April and 10 May 1914, three months before the outbreak of World War I. The Radical Party, a radical and increasingly centre-right party, emerged as the largest party, though, with the outbreak of the First World War, many in the Chamber, ranging from Catholics to socialists, united to form the Union sacrée.

Excluding one seat in Martinique that was not proclaimed, of the 602 seats up for election 192 returned new members.

Alexandre Ribot, a member of the Republican Democratic Party, negotiated a government on 9 June 1914, but its perceived overly-centrist leanings lead much of the left-wing of the Radical Party to rebel against it, bringing it down on the day it was presented to the chamber. Ribot was quickly succeeded by René Viviani of the Republican-Socialist Party, who formed a centre-left government on 13 June, only four days later.

Results

References

Sources 
https://www.france-politique.fr/elections-legislatives-1914.htm

External links
Map of Deputies elected in 1914 according to their group in the House, including overseas (in French)

Legislative elections in France
France
Legislative
France
France